"American Life" is a song by American singer-songwriter Madonna. It is the title track from her ninth studio album American Life (2003), and was released digitally as the lead single from the album on March 24, 2003, by Maverick Records. It is a pop, techno and folk song written and produced by Madonna and Mirwais Ahmadzaï; the lyrics to "American Life" feature violent transitions and a political and religious view from Madonna. She questions the shallowness of modern life and the American Dream during the presidency of George W. Bush. Towards the end of the song, Madonna raps, naming the people who were working for her.

"American Life" was panned by music critics, with Billboard criticizing Madonna's rapping, and Blender naming it as the ninth worst song of all time. Commercially, "American Life" reached number one in Canada, Denmark, Italy, and Switzerland, and the top ten in Australia, where the song was certified gold by the Australian Recording Industry Association (ARIA). Elsewhere, the song peaked at number 37 in the US Billboard Hot 100, staying in the chart for eight weeks, while it debuted and peaked at number two on the UK Singles Chart. In the United States, "American Life" became the first song ever to chart based on internet sales alone.

Two music videos were shot for the song, both directed by Swedish director Jonas Åkerlund. The first featured Madonna at a military-themed fashion show, ending with her throwing a hand grenade at George W. Bush. Prior to its release, the video caused controversy regarding its political, racial and religious implications, leading Madonna to release a statement explaining its concept. After the 2003 invasion of Iraq started, Madonna cancelled the release of the original music video, because of the political climate of the country at the time, and released an alternative version, featuring her in front of a backdrop of flags from around the world. The song was performed during promotion for American Life in 2003, on the Re-Invention World Tour (2004), the Miami stop of her Madonna: Tears of a Clown show (2016), the Stonewall 50 – WorldPride NYC 2019 festival and the Madame X Tour (2019–20).

Background and release 
"American Life" was written and produced by Madonna and Mirwais Ahmadzaï. "I could be having a guitar lesson and something will just come to me," the former observed. "Or Mirwais will send me over music – rough stuff that doesn't have an arrangement: basic chord progressions. 'American Life' itself came about like that." In April 2003, Madonna discussed her motivations behind "American Life" with VH1 while talking about her experience in the music industry. She stated "I look back at the 20 years behind me and I realized that a lot of things that I'd valued weren't important", in response to the non-materialistic themes of the record. Discussing "American Life", Madonna said:

"[The song] was like a trip down memory lane, looking back at everything I've accomplished and all the things I once valued and all the things that were important to me. What is my perspective now? I've fought for so many things, I've tried so hard to be number one and to stay on top, to look good, to be the best. And I realized that a lot of things that last and the things that matter are none of those things."

To counter illegal Internet downloads of the song both before and after the single's release, Madonna's associates created a number of false song files of similar length and size. Some of these files delivered a brief message from Madonna saying "What the fuck do you think you're doing?" followed by minutes of silence. However, the song leaked online one day before its official premiere. "American Life" premiered on March 24, 2003, through AOL. The song was released in the United States on April 8, 2003. "American Life" went on sale two days later, through digital services Liquid Audio, RioPort, and also through Madonna's website in MP3 format.

Recording and composition 

"American Life" mixes folktronica and experimental pop in its composition, written in the time signature of common time with a moderate tempo of 102 beats per minute. It is composed in the key of A major with Madonna's voice spanning from C3 to B4. The song follows a sequence of Fm–Fm5–C–Bm during the verses and Fm–Cm–Cm2–Bm–Bm2 during the chorus as its chord progression. Starting with Madonna's voice multi-tracked questioning – "Am I gonna be a star?", "Should I change my name?" – the lyrics develop into what Rikky Rooksby of The Complete Guide to the Music of Madonna states is a complaint about modern-day life. She also questions the shallowness of modern life and the American Dream. After three minutes, Madonna performs a rap naming the people who are working for her.

"Basically, we [she and Ahmadzaï] had recorded the whole song and we had this instrumental thing at the end," said Madonna, "and Mirwais was like, 'You know what, you have to go and do a rap.' And I was like, 'Get out of here, I don't rap.' And he was like, 'Yeah you do. Just go in there, just do it.' He totally encouraged me. I had nothing planned, nothing written, and he just told me to do stream-of-consciousness, whatever I was thinking. Because I was always drinking soy lattes in the studio, and I drive my Mini Cooper to the studio, I was just like, 'OK, let me just talk about the things that I like.' So I went and it was just total improv and obviously it was sloppy at first, but I got out all my thoughts and then I wrote everything down that I said and then I perfected the timing of it. So it was totally spontaneous." The repeated acoustic guitar riff "adds a touch of pathos" to the song, according to biographer Carol Gnojewski.

The lyrics accompany a "punchy octave synth figure" synchronized with a drum and bass beat. "I know it sounds clichéd," she admitted. "But I've had 20 years of fame and fortune, and I feel that I have the right to an opinion on what it is and isn't. All everyone is obsessed about now is being a celebrity. I'm saying that's bullshit, and who knows better than me? Before it happens, you have all kinds of notions about how wonderful celebrity is and how much joy it's going to bring you. Then you arrive... In America, more than any other place in the world, you have the freedom to be anything you want to be. Which is all well and good, but it only works if you have a value system – and we seem not to have one anymore. It's, 'Whatever it takes to get to the top, that's what you gotta do.' It's the allure of the beautiful life: 'Look like this, you're gonna be happy. Drive this car, you're gonna be popular. Wear these clothes and people are gonna want to fuck you.' It's a very powerful illusion and people are caught up in it, including myself. Or I was."

Critical reception 

"American Life" was met with generally negative reception from music critics. Sal Cinquemani from Slant Magazine labeled it a "trite, self-aggrandizing and often awkward song about privilege" and a "dour and robotic" track. Stylus Magazine gave a negative review and said that when one of the world's richest women complains about commercialism and the emptiness of entertainment culture, it seems hypocritical rather than insightful. He also noted that in the song, she's raging against the life she herself is leading. Chuck Taylor of Billboard gave a negative review for the song, criticizing Madonna's rapping and calling the song "a blurry snarl of style and composition that's sounds more like a disjointed medley than a song." Alexis Petridis from The Guardian was disappointed by the lyrics saying that "what on earth might her extreme point of view involve? That the world is ruled by a shadowy cabal of super-intelligent lizards?... Sadly not. Her extreme point of view turns out to be that money can't buy you happiness and that fame isn't all it's cracked up to be." He also panned the lyric "I like to express my extreme point of view", saying that it is difficult to hear that line without feeling a prickle of excitement. In August 2018, Paul Schrodt from Slant placed it at number 67 on his ranking of the singer's singles:
If you can forget that "American Life" contains possibly the worst white-girl rap of all time, it's actually an admirably gutsy lead single for an album that would effectively end Madonna's reign on the U.S. pop charts. She and producer Mirwais fuse a dreamy acoustic chorus with harsh skittering drums and laser-like synth sounds, and the disorienting shift reflects Madonna's state of mind in the lyrics, questioning the demands of the Dream Factory and moving toward something resembling personal satisfaction. It's pop as bomb-throwing protest.

Entertainment Weeklys Ken Tucker deemed it "a list celeb perks: trainer, butler, assistant, three nannies, a bodyguard or five. It seems, at first, not like the clever self-twitting she clearly intended, but rather a facile confirmation of her haters' conviction: that the middle-aged Madonna does not have a worldview beyond her next Pilates appointment". In 2004, Blender magazine listed the song at number nine on the list of the 50 Worst Songs Ever, stating that Madonna "updates the 'Material Girl'-era satire of commercialism and spiritual emptiness ... with what is hands-down the most embarrassing rap ever recorded. Nervous and choppy, she makes Debbie Harry sound as smooth as Jay-Z." The magazine also said that the worst moment of the song is when after rapping, Madonna sings 'Nothing is what it seems' with no profundity. Stephen Thompson of The A.V. Club considered the song to be "jittery, tuneless, and shallow to the point of self-parody". While ranking Madonna's singles in honor of her 60th birthday, Jude Rogers from The Guardian placed the track at number 60, calling it "a genuinely interesting concept-pop comeback". In August 2018, Billboard picked it as the singer's 63rd greatest single, calling it "easily one of the most fascinating detours in the pop-diva's history, and when taken as kitsch, the rap is strangely magnetic".

Chart performance 
"American Life" debuted at number 90 on the US Billboard Hot 100 on the week of April 5, 2003. The song debuted with first-week sales of 4,000 downloads, making the first time a song ever to chart based on Internet sales alone. A few weeks later on April 26, 2003, the song peaked at number 37, being the greatest gainer song of that week. In Canada, the song peaked at number one on the singles chart. In Australia, "American Life" debuted at its peak of number seven, during the week of April 24, 2003. In the following week, the song began its decline, and experienced a total chart trajectory of eight weeks. The song was certified Gold by the Australian Recording Industry Association (ARIA). In the New Zealand, the song peaked at number 33, and remained on the chart for one week. On the UK Singles Chart, "American Life" debuted at its peak of number two on the week of April 26, 2003, with first-week sales of 30,000 copies and being blocked to the top position by Room 5's "Make Luv".

On April 27, 2003, "American Life" debuted at number seven on the Ö3 Austria Top 40 chart, spending a total of 11 weeks in the chart. The song achieved moderate chart positions in both the Flemish and Wallonian territories in Belgium, peaking at numbers 12 and 10, respectively. Making its debut at number 61, "American Life" charted for a total of 11 weeks in France and peaked at number 10, before falling out on July 6, 2003. The song was certified Silver by the Syndicat National de l'Édition Phonographique (SNEP). On the Dutch Top 40 chart, the song made its debut at number 34. The following week it rose to number 21 and peaked at number 4, before the ending of its eleven-week run. On April 24, 2003, "American Life" debuted at number three on the Swedish Singles Chart. Similarly in Switzerland, the song debuted at number one on the Swiss Singles Chart, spending 13 weeks on the chart. In Germany, the song peaked at number 10.

Music videos 
There are two different music videos for "American Life", the first of which was not released by Madonna. It was shot in the first week of February 2003 at Los Angeles Center Studios in Los Angeles, California by Swedish director Jonas Åkerlund, who worked with Madonna in the videos for "Ray of Light" (1998) and "Music" (2000). Madonna had the idea for the music video in November 2002, then she and Åkerlund developed the idea to make an anti-war and anti-fashion mini-movie. With "American Life", she took her music videos to a different level by focusing on war, politics and, according to media interpretation, the then-upcoming invasion of Iraq. She later clarified that it was an anti-war statement, but not necessarily against Iraq War, because "at any given moment there's at least 30 wars going on in this world and I'm against all of them." Shortly after it was filmed, Warner Bros. Records released a statement regarding the music video: "[The video] expresses a panoramic view of our culture and looming war through the view of a female superhero portrayed by Madonna. Starting as a runway show of couture army fatigues, the fashion show escalates into a mad frenzy depicting the catastrophic repercussions and horrors of war." An exclusive sneak peek of the video was available on VH1's program Backstage at the Grammys.

The video begins with several male and female models dressed up as soldiers on a fashion runway, wearing military garb and gas masks with one male model sports a shirt that reads "Fashion Victim" while it is inter-cut with scenes of Madonna singing in front of a black background. In the second chorus, Middle-Eastern children are seen walking on the runway, and being bullied by the soldier models. During the bridge, Madonna and her group prepare to enter the runway in a restroom, while she carves "Protect Me" on the partition of a stall and dances angrily with them to the song. The women are also seen dancing in front of surveillance cameras. When the rap section starts, Madonna is seen crashing into the show driving a Mini Cooper and pummel the photographers with an industrial-strength water hose, while rapping and dancing on top of the car with her gang. In the end of the video, Madonna frantically drives out of the runway into the amused audience, and pulls a hand grenade with her teeth and then throws it to George W. Bush, and the video ends with him using it to light up his cigar. Madonna defended the video:

I feel lucky to be an American citizen for many reasons – one of which is the right to express myself freely, especially in my work. I understand that there have been reports about my upcoming video 'American Life' in the media – much of which is inaccurate. I am not Anti-Bush. I am not pro-Iraq. I am pro peace. I have written a song and created a video which expresses my feelings about our culture and values and the illusions of what many people believe is the American dream – the perfect life. As an artist, I hope that this provokes thought and dialogue. I don't expect everyone to agree with my point of view.
Due to the political climate of the country at the time, on April 1, 2003, Madonna pulled the video and released a statement explaining why: "I have decided not to release my new video. It was filmed before the war started and I do not believe it is appropriate to air it at this time. Due to the volatile state of the world and out of sensitivity and respect to the armed forces, who I support and pray for, I do not want to risk offending anyone who might misinterpret the meaning of this video." The singer later revealed that she and her team cancelled the video's premiere after the country's reaction to the Dixie Chicks' anti-Bush statements, fearing that she would be seen as unpatriotic; she also cited her children's lives and her husband's film career as other reasons. After pulling the original video, it was then released an edited version that premiered on April 16, 2003, on VH1, immediately after a special program called Madonna Speaks. This version features Madonna singing in front of a backdrop of ever-changing flags of different countries and territories (including Greenland, Puerto Rico and Palestine). In 2005, a director cut of the video leaked onto the Internet. It shows heavier scenes, like wounded and maimed soldiers, war scenes, images of poverty and death. In 2010, Slant Magazine placed this alternate video in the nineteenth place of the decade's fifty best music videos list, stating: "It isn't like either the video's message about viewing war as a form of popular entertainment or its striking, loaded images leave much room for misinterpretation. Prescient? Yes. Relevant? Surely. Subtle? Not so much." This version of the video ends with the tossed grenade landing on the catwalk and Madonna putting her hands on her ears.

Live performances 

To promote American Life, Madonna embarked on the American Life Promo Tour. A performance on Tower's Fourth Street in Manhattan was presented to around 400 people; the set started with Madonna, wearing black beret, polka-dot blouse, black trousers and heels, performing an acoustic performance of "American Life" followed by the track "X-Static Process". The promotional show also saw Madonna perform two other tracks from the album being "Mother and Father" and "Hollywood", before performing an "impromptu" performance of "Like a Virgin", and lastly performing the album version of "American Life". A stage was built in preparation for the performances with long dark drapes and large speakers, and according to Billboard was so that over one thousand fans nearby could hear the performance. Madonna also performed the song at HMV store in Oxford to around 500 people. While in the United Kingdom, she performed "American Life" and "Hollywood" at BBC One's Top of the Pops.

The following year, "American Life" was included on her Re-Invention World Tour. It opened the Military-Army segment and started with the sound of a helicopter in the background as Madonna's backup dancers, dressed as soldiers, crawled on their bellies as though in the middle of battle, then hugged each other as if saying goodbye. Madonna appeared onstage, on top of a structure made up of TV sets, wearing camouflage pants, an olive army jacket and black beret. She started performing the song as war footage of death and destruction flashed on screens behind her. At the end of the song, it showed a George W. Bush look-alike lovingly resting his head on the shoulder of a Saddam Hussein look-alike, as though the pair were waiting for a marriage license. During the performance, Madonna ran down a lengthy V-shaped catwalk that descended from the ceiling and allowed her to reach the middle of the stadium. Toronto Suns Jane Stevenson praised the performance, but called the background images "sober". The performance was included in the I'm Going to Tell You a Secret live album and documentary.

On October 15, 2008, Madonna performed a snippet of "American Life" as the request song during the Boston stop of her Sticky & Sweet Tour. Eight years later, Madonna sang "American Life" on her Madonna: Tears of a Clown show at a benefit gala on December 2, 2016, at Miami Beach's Faena Forum. The concert was held along with an accompanying art auction and dinner, to benefit Madonna's Raising Malawi foundation to support their projects like the Mercy James Pediatric Surgery Hospital in Malawi, as well as art and education initiatives for impoverished children in the country. The Tears of a Clown show was over an hour long, and featured Madonna giving her opinions on the 2016 United States presidential election and attacking President-elect Donald Trump. Before singing the song, Madonna spoke about the turmoils of the Native Americans and the Dakota Access Pipeline protests. On June 30, 2019, Madonna performed an acoustic guitar-driven version of "American Life" as part of her mini concert at the Stonewall 50 – WorldPride NYC 2019, to commemorate the 50th anniversary of the Stonewall riots. She came onstage dressed in a black leather jacket and a sparkling patch over her left eye and was surrounded by dancers dressed as soldiers. Joel Lynch from Billboard opined that "the message of 'American Life' has only grown more timely in the 16 years since its release". A similar performance of the song was done on the singer's Madame X Tour, that same year; Madonna played the guitar while uniforms fell down from above the stage and dancers dressed as soldiers dragged a coffin covered with a flag. For Rolling Stones Rob Sheffield it was one "of the night’s big musical surprises".

Track listings and formats 

 US maxi single
 "American Life" (Missy Elliott's American Dream Mix) – 4:49
 "American Life" (Oakenfold Downtempo Remix) – 5:32
 "American Life" (Felix Da Housecat's Devin Dazzle Club Mix) – 6:10
 "American Life" (Peter Rauhofer's American Anthem) (Part 1) – 10:41
 "American Life" (Peter Rauhofer's American Anthem) (Part 2) – 9:06
 "Die Another Day" (Richard Humpty Vission Electrofield Mix) – 6:01

 UK 2× 12-inch vinyl
 "American Life" (Missy Elliott's American Dream Remix) – 4:49
 "American Life" (Oakenfold Downtempo Remix) – 5:32
 "American Life" (Peter Rauhofer's American Anthem) (Part 1) – 10:41
 "American Life" (Felix Da Housecat's Devin Dazzle Club Mix) – 6:10
 "Die Another Day" (Calderone & Quayle Afterlife Mix) – 8:52
 "American Life" (Peter Rauhofer's American Anthem) (Part 2) – 9:06

 US CD single
 "American Life" (Radio Edit) – 4:27
 "Die Another Day" (Calderone & Quayle Afterlife Mix) – 8:52

 German two-track promo
 "American Life" (Radio Edit Without Rap) – 4:10
 "American Life" (Radio Edit) – 4:27

 UK maxi single 1
 "American Life" (Radio Edit) – 4:27
 "American Life" (Missy Elliott American Dream Remix) – 4:49
 "American Life" (Peter Rauhofer's American Anthem) (Part 1) – 10:41

 UK maxi single 2
 "American Life" (Radio Edit) – 4:27
 "American Life" (Oakenfold Downtempo Remix) – 5:32
 "American Life" (Felix Da Housecat's Devin Dazzle Club Mix) – 6:10

 US 7-inch single
 "American Life" (Radio Edit) – 4:27
 "Die Another Day" (Richard Humpty Vission Radio Edit) – 3:36

Credits and personnel 
Credits and personnel are adapted from American Life album liner notes.
 Madonna – songwriter, producer
 Mirwais Ahmadzaï – producer, programming, guitar
 Mike "Spike" Stent – mixing
 Tim Young – mastering
 Tom Hannen – assistant engineer
 Simon Changer – assistant engineer

Charts

Weekly charts

Year-end charts

Certifications and sales

Release history

See also 
 List of anti-war songs
 List of Billboard Hot Dance Music/Club Play number ones of 2003
 List of number-one hits of 2003 (Italy)
 List of number-one singles of the 2000s (Switzerland)
 List of number-one singles of 2003 (Canada)
 List of number-one songs of the 2000s (Denmark)

References

Bibliography 

 
 
 

2003 singles
American folk songs
Anti-war songs
Canadian Singles Chart number-one singles
Cultural depictions of George W. Bush
Folktronica songs
Madonna songs
Maverick Records singles
Music video controversies
Music videos directed by Jonas Åkerlund
Number-one singles in Denmark
Number-one singles in Italy
Number-one singles in Portugal
Number-one singles in Switzerland
Songs written by Madonna
Songs written by Mirwais Ahmadzaï
Song recordings produced by Madonna
Song recordings produced by Mirwais Ahmadzaï
Songs of the Iraq War
Warner Records singles